Krystian Lamberski (Greek: Κριστιάν Λαμπέρσκι; born 23 August 1979 in Poland) is a Polish retired footballer who is last known to have worked as a coach at Olympic Wrocław in his home country.

Career
Lamberski started his senior career with Polar Wrocław in the late 1990s. In 2003, he signed for Górnik Konin in the Polish III liga, where he made twenty-six appearances and scored one goal. After that, he played for Polish club Górnik Polkowice, Irish club Waterford, Greek clubs Thyella Patras, Keravnos Keratea, and A.E. Iraklei, Polish clubs olonia Środa Śląska, Piast Żerniki (Wrocław), and Orzeł Prusice before retiring in 2014.

References

External links 
 Kocham Cię jak Irlandię 
 Zostać w Polarze 
 Łączy nas piłka Profile
 Extratime.ie Profile

Polish footballers
Waterford F.C. players
Expatriate association footballers in the Republic of Ireland
Expatriate footballers in Greece
Association football defenders
Polish expatriate footballers
Górnik Konin players
Górnik Polkowice players
Polar Wrocław players
Polish football managers
Living people
1979 births